The Bürgenstock Funicular (BB) is a funicular railway in the canton of Nidwalden, Switzerland. The line links the landing stage at Kehrsiten-Bürgenstock, served by the regular passenger boats of the Schifffahrtsgesellschaft des Vierwaldstättersees, with the Bürgenstock resort and its famous hotels.

The funicular was opened in 1888 and was originally had an Abt rack braking rail. The funicular is electric and automatic, but until the closure in 2011 it still used the original cabins. The line has been suspended since November 2011 whilst work is undertaken to create a new luxury resort financed by a Qatar finance group at its upper station, and was reopened on 28 August 2017.

It got bad press even before its reopening due to its exorbitant fare prices which are high, even for Swiss standards. The resort management announced a fare of CHF 50 for a roundtrip.

The line has the following parameters:

See also 
 List of funicular railways
 List of funiculars in Switzerland

Further reading

References

External links 
 
 Bürgenstock-Bahn page on Bürgenstock web site

Funicular railways in Switzerland
Transport in Nidwalden
Railway lines opened in 1888
Metre gauge railways in Switzerland